Monroe is a village in Orange County, New York, United States. The population was 9,343 at the 2020 census. It is part of the Poughkeepsie–Newburgh–Middletown, NY Metropolitan Statistical Area as well as the larger New York–Newark–Bridgeport, NY-NJ-CT-PA Combined Statistical Area. The community is named not after President James Monroe; rather its name is taken from that of  an early 19th-century New York state senator.

The Village of Monroe is in the northwestern part of the Town of Monroe by NY Route 17 (soon to be Interstate 86) and US 6. NY 17M is its main street.

History
The former Village of Kiryas Joel in Orange County officially split from Monroe, New York on New Year's Day 2019, becoming the Town of Palm Tree, New York.

Palm Tree came into being as a result of a 2017 referendum in which more than 80% of Monroe voters opted to branch off into their own town, the paper reported.
Palm Tree — all 220 acres and roughly 20,000 residents of it — becomes New York's first new town since East Rochester, was formed in 1981.

Geography
Monroe is located at  (41.323786, -74.187969).

According to the United States Census Bureau, the village has a total area of 3.5 square miles (9.0 km2), of which 3.4 square miles (8.9 km2)  is land and 0.1 square mile (0.1 km2)  (1.44%) is water.

Demographics

As of the census of 2000, there were 7,780 people, 2,569 households, and 2,101 families residing in the village. The population density was 2,269.7 people per square mile (875.8/km2). There were 2,620 housing units at an average density of 764.3 per square mile (294.9/km2). The racial makeup of the village was 91.03% White, 2.57% Black or African American, 0.40% Native American, 2.34% Asian, 0.01% Pacific Islander, 2.28% from other races, and 1.38% from two or more races. Hispanic or Latino of any race were 8.73% of the population. 22.9% were of Irish, 22.4% Italian, 6.3% Polish and 6.3% German ancestry according to Census 2000. 86.9% spoke English, 7.1% Spanish, 2.4% Ukrainian and 1.2% Italian as their first language.

There were 2,569 households, out of which 44.6% had children under the age of 18 living with them, 69.8% were married couples living together, 8.0% had a female householder with no husband present, and 18.2% were non-families. 14.6% of all households were made up of individuals, and 5.7% had someone living alone who was 65 years of age or older. The average household size was 3.01 and the average family size was 3.35.

In the village, the population was spread out, with 29.4% under the age of 18, 6.4% from 18 to 24, 31.0% from 25 to 44, 23.9% from 45 to 64, and 9.4% who were 65 years of age or older. The median age was 36 years. For every 100 females, there were 98.8 males. For every 100 females age 18 and over, there were 94.7 males.

The median income for a household in the village was $70,809, and the median income for a family was $76,894. Males had a median income of $63,033 versus $33,184 for females. The per capita income for the village was $25,614. About 4.6% of families and 4.8% of the population were below the poverty line, including 3.5% of those under age 18 and 5.1% of those age 65 or over.

Other village in the Town of Monroe
Harriman

References

External links

 Village website
 The Photo News, community newspaper

Villages in New York (state)
Villages in Orange County, New York
Poughkeepsie–Newburgh–Middletown metropolitan area
Populated places established in 1741